Fidelio is the only opera written by Ludwig van Beethoven.

Fidelio may also refer to:

Fidelio (film), an Australian television live recording of the opera
Fidelio (magazine), a journal of the Lyndon LaRouche movement
Fidelio Records, a classical music label
"Fidelio", a password in the film Eyes Wide Shut
Fidelio, discontinued software from Hotline Connect
MICROS Fidelio, a property management system for hotels
Fidelio F. Finke (1891–1968), Bohemian/German composer
 Fidelio award, of Music and Arts University of the City of Vienna
 "Witte Brigade-Fidelio", from 1944 the name of the Belgian WW II-era resistance group White Brigade. "Fidelio" was the code name for its founder and commander, Marcel Louette.

See also
524 Fidelio, an asteroid
Fidel (disambiguation)
Fidelia (disambiguation)
Fidelis (disambiguation)